is a New Zealand rugby union player who plays as a Flanker.

In July 2021, Kafatolu was named in the Tonga squad for the July internationals.

References

External links
 

1989 births
Living people
Rugby union flankers
Sunwolves players